Jair Ventura Filho (born 25 December 1944), better known as Jairzinho, is a Brazilian former professional footballer. A quick, skillful, and powerful right winger known for his finishing ability and eye for goal, he was a key member and top scorer of the legendary Brazil national team that won the 1970 FIFA World Cup. He is nicknamed The Hurricane in reference to the way his jersey would shake as he ran down the wing during his playing days. A versatile forward, he was also capable of playing in a variety of other attacking positions, as a main striker, second striker, or even as an attacking midfielder. Jairzinho was known for his large afro towards the later stages of his career, as well as his burst of pace, dribbling, ball skills, finishing ability, shot power and devastating strength due to his large muscular build.

Due to the economic and political situation of the time, as well as the Sport Legislation, he played most of his club football in South America where he spent eleven years at Rio de Janeiro club Botafogo. He went on to play in Europe during the final years of his career, a common pattern for South American players until the 1980s, when the economic and political situation changed. Jairzinho replaced his footballing idol Garrincha in both the Botafogo and Brazil teams, and played in three consecutive World Cups: 1966, 1970 and 1974.

Early years
Jair Ventura Filho was born on 25 December 1944 in Rio de Janeiro, Jairzinho's family left Duque de Caxias for Rio in the late 50s. Living on Rua General Severiano where he went through the youth setup at local club Botafogo.

Club career

Botafogo
Jairzinho started his football career in 1958 aged 13 assigned to the Botafogo youth setup and working as a ball boy for the first team. He made his professional debut with the club as a striker at the age of fifteen in 1960. His idol Garrincha, whom he would eventually replace for both club and country, also played at Botafogo, albeit in Jairzinho's preferred position on the right wing. This resulted in Jairzinho spending most of his early games playing on the left wing or as a centre forward. However, he would fill in as a right winger, by far his strongest position, when Garrincha was injured.

Jairzinho finally established himself as a Botafogo regular in 1965 aged 21 and was seen as a phenomenal rising star to the entire nation. During this young age he was already playing with Brazil and Botofogo superstars such as Gérson, Mario Zagallo and Garrincha.

In 1968, Botafogo won the Brazilian double. Winners of the 1968 Campeonato Carioca and the Taça Guanabara in which Jairzinho would score 9 goals in 11 games. By this time Garrincha had already left Botafogo in 1966 and would enable Jairzinho to play in his natural right wing position. Botafogo would then top off the year with a 3rd trophy towards the end of the year winning the 1968 Campeonato Brasileiro Série A (Taça Brasil) The following 1969 Campeonato Carioca season he would score 7 goals, progressing onto the next 1970 Campeonato Carioca just before the World Cup Jairzinho would finish Botafogo's top scorer with 9 goals.

After Jairzinho's excellent display in Mexico at the 1970 FIFA World Cup more eyes of the world were focused on his Botofogo side. In the final four years of his time at Botafogo he'd prove to finalise himself as one of the club's most prolific goalscorers in the history of single starred Brazilian club, scoring 186 goals in 413 appearances with a goals per game ratio of 0,45. He ranks 6th in all time top goal scorers for Botafogo. One of his most standout performance starred in 1972 in which he scored a hattrick vs Flamengo during a famous 6-0 victory, one of the most memorable in Botafogo's history. In the same year he would also receive the Bronze Award for the South American Footballer of the Year.

Marseille

In 1974, when the sports legislation in Brazil finally changed Jairzinho made a €300,000 (£125,000) move to Ligue 1 side Olympique de Marseille. One of the most expensive signings up to date at the time. Along with his Botafogo and Brazil teammate Caju.

Jairzinho was seen as such a star and Brazilian great throughout the French fans the day before his debut game vs AS Monaco FC more than 10,000 fans came to attend the pre training session in order to watch his first moments at the club. Jairzinho scored in his first game vs Monaco in a 4-1 victory and was immediately seen as a prominent world class winger to dominate Europe.

Jairzinho would go on to score 9 goals in only 18 games as his time was cut out short due to backroom management issues. Though he made a good impact with his goals and produced a memorable performance vs FC Nantes in the Coupe de France scoring 2 goals in a 4-0 victory, his time was cut out short at the French side mainly due to a scuffle in which both Jairzinho and Paulo Cesar were found guilty of attacking the referee after a following 2-2 game vs Paris Saint-Germain Football Club. They would both end up leaving in the summer of 1975.

Kaizer Chiefs

According to Jairzinho, Kaizer Chiefs co-owner Ewert Nene invited him to play a few trial games after his tricky situation in reaction to his Marseille departure. Jairzinho agreed a short term deal until the start of 1976. He also stated in an interview the main reason he agreed to sign is because of the stadium atmosphere and the heartwarming reception every time he stepped on the pitch, apparently he was "treated like a king."

Jairzinho rarely played for the Chiefs. However in only 3 league games he scored 7 goals and regained his sharpness during his time in South Africa.

Cruzeiro

After the expiration of Jairzinho's contract in South Africa he would finally reestablish himself as the world class Brazilian forward talent he was typically seen as. Jairzinho signed with Cruzeiro at the beginning of 1976 just before the season campaign started.

Jairzinho would spend a season at Cruzeiro and score 31 goals in 43 games across all competitions. He would finish 2nd highest goal scorer in the 1976 Copa Libertadores with 12 goals in 12 appearances whilst also bringing home the pinnacle of South American continental success. Jairzinho would only spend a year at Cruz however it was a very successful short period.

Portuguesa

Jairzinho at the age of 32 was still seen as an exceptionally talented played and was a surprise to see him join Venezuelan side Portuguesa in 1977.

Jairzinho made Portuguesa one of the greatest teams in Venezuelan history, helping Portuguesa win a record 16 games in a row and their fourth of five championships. He scored 22 league goals within 24 games throughout the year and in 1 year he would score 3 hattricks.

Noroeste and Fast Club

Towards the final stages of his career, Jairzinho would have a brief spell at Brazilian club Noroeste competing in the 1978 Campeonato Brasileiro Série A. However, Noroeste would only finish 28th in the final standings and Jairzinho would only feature in very few games and score only 3 goals.

A year later Jairzinho would join 2nd tier Campeonato Amazonense side Fast Clube and would score 10 goals throughout the year.

Jorge Wilstermann and return to Botafogo

In 1980, Jairzinho was looking to see out the rest of his career and signed for Bolivian side Club Deportivo Jorge Wilstermann aged 35. He would be used as a rotational player in a title winning side, scoring 6 goals that campaign.

In 1981, Jairzinho would return to Botafogo for the last true season of his career in which he would be idolised by the upcoming youth players and again be used rotationally. He would score 1 goal in an Amistoso match in 1981 in Botafogo colours to end off a fantastic career.

International career

Jairzinho made his international debut as a 19 year old in 1964 against Portugal, again when Garrincha was injured. He played in the 1966 FIFA World Cup in England, however with Garrincha back in the side he played as a left winger. Jairzinho struggled to be effective in this position especially at his young age, and he couldn't prevent Brazil from exiting the competition at the first round. When, after the tournament, Garrincha announced his retirement from international football, Jairzinho finally took over his idol's role for Brazil on the right wing. Jairzinho scored 2 goals out of the 6 1970 FIFA World Cup qualification matches 

Now in his favourite position, Jairzinho became a far more effective and consistent performer for country. At the 1970 FIFA World Cup in Mexico, Jairzinho was one of stars of the tournament. He made history by scoring in every game Brazil played in for the Seleção, for which he received the epithet "Furacão da Copa" (World Cup Hurricane). His second goal vs Czechoslovakia was one of the goals of the tournament, completing an incredible solo run, beating 3 or 4 players to unleash a powerful low driven shot to ripple the bottom left corner, which goes down as one of the most memorable goals in World Cup history.

He scored his seventh goal of the tournament in Brazil's 4–1 world cup win over Italy in the final. However, his impressive goals tally at the finals were not enough to win the Golden Boot, which went to Germany's Gerd Müller, who scored ten goals. Jairzinho has claimed that FIFA awarded him a "best body on the planet" prize for his athleticism; however, FIFA has no record of this award.

Jairzinho scored two goals in the 1974 FIFA World Cup, which would prove to be his last World Cup for Brazil. The third-place final was his last match for Brazil until he was given a one-off farewell cap against Czechoslovakia on March 3, 1982 in a game which Brazil drew 1–1. He scored 33 goals in 81 games during his international career.

Style of play

Throughout his whole career, Jairzinho was seen as a versatile forward who could cause damage and impose a severe goal threat from anywhere on the pitch. He possessed lightning speed and a quick burst of acceleration, an excellent first touch and dribbling skills, but his most feared attribute, his strength.

Many have claimed it takes minimum 3 men to push him off the ball. And Jairzinho was a hard working team player who would constantly track back and use his body structure to hold off counter attacks and block runs.

His runs off the ball were one of the main reasons he collected so many goals for his Botafogo record. In the 1970 FIFA World Cup he displayed to the world his attacking instincts especially with his goal vs England which earned Brazil the victory and broke the 0-0 deadlock. The secondary run off Pelé for him to tuck away a powerful top left corner finish displayed his threat in front of goal as well as his movement.

His finishing ability was second to none. The timing, accuracy and power Jairzinho would develop behind his shots were almost perfect and unsavable. He also possessed powerful and accurate shots with his left foot making him a nightmare for opposition defenders to close down.

As well as his effective simple play Jairzinho possessed many talents on the ball and phenomenal technical ability. One of his signature moves included flicking the ball up from a pass in open play inside the box and cushioning it perfectly for an open shot. In terms of technical ability he also possesses smart creativity, which is shown from the ball Jairzinho put in for Pelé vs England following the famous Gordon Banks save. Some may say Jairzinho is one of the most complete forwards of all time.

Managerial career

After retiring as a footballer, Jairzinho became a coach and managed a number of youth teams in his native Brazil. He also worked in Japan, Saudi Arabia and the United Arab Emirates. In 1997, Jairzinho began his first journey as manager in Europe being appointed at Greek Super League club Kalamata. He was sacked due to poor results, his side relegated at the end of the season. Jairzinho was named head coach of the Gabon national team. However, he was sacked by Gabon's Football Federation after a crushing defeat against Angola in a World Cup 2006 Qualifier held in Luanda. Perhaps his greatest achievement as a coach was spotting Ronaldo as a 14-year-old whilst he was coaching São Cristóvão. He kick-started the career of the future three-time FIFA World Player of the Year by recommending him to Cruzeiro, his former side, and the Brazil youth team.
Jairzinho is currently the manager of Esprof Atletico futebol Clube, a team based in Cabo Frio, Rio de Janeiro state who play in the Campeonato Carioca.

Career statistics

International goals
Scores and results list Brazil's goal tally first.

Personal life
Jairzinho's son, also known as Jair Ventura, is also a former footballer who managed Corinthians, Botafogo and Santos.

Honours

Club
Botafogo
Taça Brasil: 1968
Campeonato Carioca: 1961, 1962, 1967, 1968
Torneio Rio – São Paulo: 1964, 1966
Torneio de Caracas: 1967, 1968, 1970

Cruzeiro
Copa Libertadores: 1976

International
Brazil
 Pan American Games champion: 1963
FIFA World Cup: 1970
Brazil Independence Cup: 1972

Individual
FIFA World Cup Silver Boot: 1970
FIFA World Cup All-Star Team: 1970
South American Player of the Year: Bronze award 1972
World Soccer: 27th Greatest Player of the 20th Century
IFFHS Brazilian Player of the 20th Century (19th place)
Brazilian Football Museum Hall of Fame

References

External links

 
 
 Jairzinho & Gordon Banks reminisce about Mexico 70, FourFourTwo magazine, 2002

1944 births
Living people
1966 FIFA World Cup players
1970 FIFA World Cup players
1974 FIFA World Cup players
Al-Wehda Club (Mecca) managers
Association football wingers
Botafogo de Futebol e Regatas players
Brazil international footballers
Brazilian expatriate football managers
Brazilian expatriate footballers
Brazilian expatriate sportspeople in Bolivia
Brazilian expatriate sportspeople in Ecuador
Brazilian expatriate sportspeople in France
Brazilian expatriate sportspeople in Saudi Arabia
Brazilian expatriate sportspeople in South Africa
Brazilian expatriate sportspeople in Venezuela
Brazilian football managers
Brazilian footballers
C.D. Jorge Wilstermann players
Campeonato Brasileiro Série A players
Cruzeiro Esporte Clube players
Copa Libertadores-winning players
Expatriate football managers in Gabon
Expatriate football managers in Saudi Arabia
Expatriate footballers in Bolivia
Expatriate footballers in Ecuador
Expatriate footballers in France
Expatriate footballers in Venezuela
Expatriate soccer players in South Africa
FIFA World Cup-winning players
Footballers at the 1983 Pan American Games
French beach soccer players
Gabon national football team managers
Kaizer Chiefs F.C. players
Ligue 1 players
Medalists at the 1983 Pan American Games
Olympique de Marseille players
Pan American Games gold medalists for Brazil
Pan American Games medalists in football
Saudi Professional League managers
Footballers from Rio de Janeiro (city)
Brazilian expatriate sportspeople in Greece
Brazilian expatriate sportspeople in Gabon
Expatriate football managers in Greece